Proletarsky District may refer to:
Proletarsky District, Russia, several districts and city districts in Russia
Proletarskyi Raion (Donetsk) (Proletarsky District), a city district of Donetsk, Ukraine